The 1981 European Judo Championships were the 30th edition of the European Judo Championships, and were held in Debrecen, Hungary on 17 May 1981.

Medal overview

Men

Medal table

Results overview

Men

60 kg

65 kg

71 kg

78 kg

86 kg

95 kg

95+ kg

Open class

References

External links
 

E
Judo
European Judo Championships
Sport in Debrecen
European 1981
International sports competitions hosted by Hungary
Judo Championships